Denley Loge is an American politician. He serves as a Republican member of the Montana House of Representatives, where he represents District 14, including St. Regis, Montana.

He attended the University of Montana and practices Lutheranism.

References

Living people
People from Mineral County, Montana
Republican Party members of the Montana House of Representatives
21st-century American politicians
1950 births
University of Montana alumni